The Merehani was a Slavic tribe mentioned by the Bavarian Geographer. They are often connected to the Moravians (Marhari), although some scholars believe that the tribe was separate.

The 9th-century Catalogue of Fortresses and Regions to the North of the Danubewhich lists the peoples along the borders of East Francia in a north-to-south ordermentions that the Moravians or Marharii had 11 fortresses or civitates. The document locates the Marhari between the Bohemians and the Bulgars, and also makes mention of the Merehani and their 30 fortresses.

According to Havlík, who writes that Conversion is a consolidated version of notes made by several authors in different years, the Moravians are twice mentioned in the text: first as Marhari, and next as Merehani. He says, that the reference to the Marhari and their 11 fortresses was made between 817 and 843, and the note of the Merehani shows the actual state under Svatopluk I.

In contrast with Havlík, Steinhübel together with Třeštík and Vlasto identify the Merehani with the inhabitants of the Principality of Nitra.

A third view is presented by Püspöki-Nagy and Senga, who write that the reference to the Merehaniiwho obviously inhabited the southern regions of the Great Hungarian Plains to the north of the Danube, but south of the territories dominated by the Bulgarsand their 30 fortresses shows the existence of another "Moravia" in Central Europe.

According to Komatina, they lived in the valleys of present-day Morava river basin in Serbia, and were still unconquered by the Bulgarians. However, after 845, the Bulgars added these Slavs to their societas (they are last mentioned in 853).

References

Sources
 
 
 
 
 
 
 
 
 
  
 

9th century in Serbia
9th century in Romania
History of Banat
Great Moravia
West Slavic tribes
South Slavic tribes